Tang Naixin (Simplified Chinese: 唐乃鑫) (born April 29, 1988 in Qingdao) is a Chinese football player.

Club career

Chengdu Wuniu

Tianjin Songjiang

Sichuan Meilianshu

References

External links
Player profile at enorth.com
Player profile at titan24.com

1988 births
Living people
Chinese footballers
Footballers from Qingdao
Chengdu Tiancheng F.C. players
Tianjin Tianhai F.C. players
Association football defenders